The Japan Handball Association (JHA) (Japanese: 日本ハンドボール協会) is the governing body of handball and beach handball in Japan. JHA is affiliated to the Asian Handball Federation (AHF), Japanese Olympic Committee and International Handball Federation (IHF) since 1952.

Competitions
Japan Handball League

National teams
Japan men's national handball team
Japan men's national junior handball team
Japan men's national youth handball team
Japan women's national handball team
Japan women's national junior handball team
Japan women's national youth handball team

Competitions hosted

International
2020 Summer Olympics
2019 World Women's Handball Championship
2001 World Games
1997 World Men's Handball Championship

Continental
 2024 Asian Men's Handball Championship
2018 Asian Women's Handball Championship
2011 Asian Women's Youth Handball Championship
2006 Asian Men's Junior Handball Championship
2004 Asian Women's Handball Championship
2000 Asian Men's Handball Championship
1999 Asian Women's Handball Championship
1998 Asian Women's Junior Handball Championship
1994 Asian Games
1991 Asian Women's Handball Championship
1991 Asian Men's Handball Championship

References

External links
Japan Handball Association at the IHF website.
Official Website

Handball governing bodies
Handball in Japan
Handball
Asian Handball Federation
1952 establishments in Japan